AL-38022A is an indazole derivative drug which is one of a range of similar drugs developed for scientific research and with some possible clinical applications. It acts as a potent and selective agonist for the 5-HT2 family of serotonin receptors, with highest binding affinity for the 5-HT2C subtype and around 4x less affinity for 5-HT2A and 5-HT2B. In drug discrimination tests on animals, it fully substituted for both DOM and 5-MeO-DMT.

See also 
 AL-34662
 AL-37350A
 Ro60-0175
 VER-3323
 YM-348

References 

Amines
Indazoles
Dihydropyrans
Serotonin receptor agonists
Heterocyclic compounds with 3 rings